Jorgen Arendt Jensen from the Technical University of Denmark, Lyngby, Denmark was named Fellow of the Institute of Electrical and Electronics Engineers (IEEE) in 2012 for contributions to medical ultrasound imaging systems.

References

Fellow Members of the IEEE
Living people
Year of birth missing (living people)
Place of birth missing (living people)
Academic staff of the Technical University of Denmark